Bloodmoon: I is the tenth studio album by American metalcore band Converge, and a collaboration album with Chelsea Wolfe. It was released on November 19, 2021, via  Epitaph Records and Deathwish Inc, the band's first studio album in four years since 2017's The Dusk in Us. Converge's longtime collaborator Stephen Brodsky and Wolfe's longtime collaborator Ben Chisholm also contributed. The album was produced by Converge guitarist Kurt Ballou and the artwork was created by the band's singer Jacob Bannon. It was met with universal critical acclaim, receiving an average score of 89 based on 10 reviews aggregated by Metacritic.

Background
The album was preceded in 2016 by Blood Moon, in which Converge united with Wolfe and her collaborator Ben Chisholm as well as former Converge member and longtime collaborator Stephen Brodsky of Cave In and Steve Von Till of Neurosis to perform classic Converge songs live in an atmospheric post-rock style. All of the aforementioned except Von Till reunited to record Bloodmoon: I. Bannon stated, "These songs were written by seven people. Not only shaped by the seven, but we're all in that mix together — more so than any other Converge record." The lineup began working on the album in late 2019, but in 2020, due to COVID, the rest of the album was finished remotely.

Release and promotion 
On September 28, 2021, Converge announced the album, including its tracklist and cover art, and released the title single "Blood Moon", accompanied by a video for the song. On November 3, Converge released the song "Coil" available for streaming. The collaborative act will perform its first Bloodmoon shows in April 2022 in Boston and New York with Caspian opening.

Reception 

Bloodmoon: I was met with universal critical acclaim. At Metacritic, which assigns a normalized rating out of 100 to reviews from mainstream publications, it received an average score of 89 based on 10 reviews.

Accolades

Year-end lists

Track listing

Personnel
Converge & Chelsea Wolfe
 Jacob Bannon – vocals, bass
 Chelsea Wolfe – vocals, guitars
 Kurt Ballou – guitars, bass, backing vocals
 Stephen Brodsky – guitars, bass, additional vocals
 Nate Newton – bass, guitars, backing vocals
 Ben Chisholm – synth, piano, electronics, bass
 Ben Koller – drums, percussion
Recording personnel
 Kurt Ballou – producer, engineer, mixing
 Zach Weeks – assistant engineer
 Magnus Lindberg – mastering
Artwork and design
 Jacob Bannon – artwork, design and illustrations

Charts

References

External links
 Official Converge Website

2021 albums
Converge (band) albums
Chelsea Wolfe albums
Collaborative albums
Albums produced by Kurt Ballou
Albums with cover art by Jacob Bannon
Deathwish Inc. albums
Epitaph Records albums